Henri Lorenzo P. Subido (born February 17, 1997) is a Filipino professional basketball player for the Davao Occidental Tigers of the Pilipinas Super League. He was drafted 24th overall by the NorthPort during the 2019 PBA draft. He played college basketball for the UST Growling Tigers of the University Athletic Association of the Philippines (UAAP).

Professional career
Subido was drafted 24th overall pick by the NorthPort Batang Pier, in his rookie season he averaged 6.1 points, 1.1 rebounds, 2.2 assists and 0.3 steals per game and later he was named to the  PBA All-Rookie Team.

PBA career statistics

As of the end of 2022–23 season

Season-by-season averages

|-
| align=left | 
| align=left | NorthPort
| 11 || 21.0 || .307 || .353 || 1.000 || 1.1 || 2.2 || .3 || .0 || 6.1
|-
| align=left | 
| align=left | NorthPort
| 8 || 4.2 || .333 || .286 || 1.000 || .3 || .4 || .1 || .0 || 1.3
|-
| align=left | 
| align=left | NorthPort
| 3 || 7.1 || .143 || .000 || .500 || .7 || 1.0 || .0 || .0 || 1.0
|-class=sortbottom
| align="center" colspan=2 | Career
| 22 || 13.0 || .297 || .328 || .857 || .7 || 1.4 || .2 || .0 || 3.6

References

External links
PBA.ph profile

1997 births
Living people
De La Salle University alumni
Filipino men's basketball players
Maharlika Pilipinas Basketball League players
NorthPort Batang Pier draft picks
NorthPort Batang Pier players
Point guards
UST Growling Tigers basketball players